Range Line Road is the main commercial thoroughfare for Joplin, Missouri.  The southern portion of Range Line is where most of Joplin's hotels are located, this is known as the hotel district.  The hotel district is also home to many national chain restaurants, as well as a few retail stores.  North of 32nd street you run into the main commercial district of Joplin, also known as the Range Line retail district.  Along the retail district you can find many national chain stores as well as local merchants.  On the northern end of Range Line is Northpark Mall, the regions largest shopping mall.  Many national chain stores are in Northpark Mall, as well as the area surrounding the mall.  As Range Line runs north of the mall it eventually runs into Webb City, Missouri and becomes Madison Avenue.

Transportation in Newton County, Missouri
Transportation in Jasper County, Missouri
Joplin, Missouri